Andanjerd (also known as Andangerd) is a village in Roshtkhar Rural District, in the Central District of Roshtkhar County, Razavi Khorasan Province, Iran. At the 2006 census, its population was 235, in 60 families.

See also 

 List of cities, towns and villages in Razavi Khorasan Province

References 

Populated places in Roshtkhar County